The Fritz London Memorial Lectures at Duke University invites scientists who impinge at one or more points upon the various fields of physics and chemistry to which Fritz London contributed. The series is partially supported by an endowment fund established by John Bardeen "to perpetuate the memory of Fritz London, distinguished scientist and member of the Duke faculty from 1939 to the time of his death in 1954, and to promote research and understanding of Physics at Duke University and in the wider scientific community. "

List of lecturers
 1956 Lothar Wolfgang Nordheim
 1957 James Franck
 1958 Hendrik Casimir
 1959 Felix Bloch
 1960 Cornelis J. Gorter
 1962 Linus C. Pauling
 1963 Peter J.W. Debye
 1964 John Bardeen
 1965 William M. Fairbank
 1966 Chen Ning Yang
 1968 Walter Thirring
 1969 Eugene P. Wigner
 1971 Lars Onsager
 1972 Jesse Beams
 1973 David Pines
 1974 J. Robert Schrieffer
 1975 Michael Fisher
 1976 Hans Bethe
 1977 Victor Weisskopf
 1978 Philip W. Anderson
 1981 Edward Teller
 1982 Murray Gell-Mann
 1984 John C. Wheatley
 1984 John A. Wheeler
 1985 Pierre-Gilles de Gennes
 1986 Richard N. Zare
 1987 Benjamin Widom
 1988 K. Alex Müller
 1989 William Klemperer
 1990 Freeman Dyson
 1991 Rudolph Marcus
 1992 Heinrich Rohrer
 1993 John C. Polanyi
 1994 
 1995 Walter Kohn
 1996 Russell J. Donnelly
 1998 Robert C. Richardson
 1999 Ahmed H. Zewail
 2000 Wolfgang Ketterle
 2001 Richard Smalley
 2002 Harry Swinney
 2003 Harry B. Gray: Electron Tunneling Through Proteins
 2004 Myriam Sarachik: Metal-Insulator Transitions
 2005 Charles M. Lieber: Nanotechnology: Emerging Opportunities in Electronics, Biology and Much More!
 2006 Frank Wilczek: The Universe is a Strange Place
 2007 John Hopfield: How do we Think so Fast? From Neurons to Brain Computations
 2008  : Novel Ways of Studying Fluid Flows
 2009 William H. Miller: Quantum effects in the dynamics of complex molecular systems
 2010 Anthony James Leggett: Does the everyday world really obey quantum mechanics?
 2011 Daan Frenkel:Van der Waals, Kamerlingh Onnes, and Phase Transitions: From Helium to Protein Crystal Nucleation
 2012 Mildred Dresselhaus:The Wonders of Low-Dimensional Nanocarbons
 2013 Judith Klinman:Moving through Barriers: Unlocking the Mysteries of How Enzymes Really Work
 2014 David Weitz: Dripping, Jetting, Drops and Wetting: The Magic of Microfluidics
 2015 Mark A. Ratner: "By Indirections find Directions Out: Electronic Motion in Non-periodic Molecular Solids"
 2016 Sidney R. Nagel: "The Life and Death of a Drop"
 2017 Emily A. Carter: "Quantum mechanical solutions for our energy future"
 2018 Charles L. Kane: "Topological Phases of Matter"
 2019 Josef Michl: "Porphene - a Heterocyclic Analog of Graphene"

References

London